Estadio Monumental de Condebamba is a multi-use stadium in Abancay, Peru. It is currently used mostly for football matches and is the home stadium of Deportivo Educación of the Copa Perú. The stadium holds 12,000 spectators. 

Monumental de Condebamba
Buildings and structures in Apurímac Region